Glenn Hart is a Canadian politician, who represented the Whitehorse, Yukon electoral district of Riverdale South in the Yukon Legislative Assembly from 2002 to 2011. He is a member of the Yukon Party.

Political career

Hart was elected in Riverdale South in the snap Yukon election of November 2002. He defeated incumbent Yukon Liberal Cabinet minister Sue Edelman, who had held the riding since 1996.

He was appointed to the Cabinet of Yukon Premier Dennis Fentie on November 30, 2002, as the Minister of Community Services, the Minister of Highways and Public Works, and the Minister in charge of the Yukon Housing Corporation.

Hart was re-elected as MLA for Riverdale South in the 2006 Yukon election and re-appointed to Cabinet as Minister of Community Services, Minister of the Public Service Commission, and the Minister responsible for the French Language Services Directorate. He served in that capacity until July 3, 2008, when he was appointed the Minister of Health and Social Services and the Minister responsible for the Yukon Workers' Compensation Health and Safety Board. He retained responsibility for the French Language Services Directorate.

Hart was defeated in his second re-election attempt of 2011, losing to New Democrat Jan Stick, a former Whitehorse City Councillor.

Personal life

Hart, a former civil servant, is married with three sons. He was active in the establishment of Whitehorse's Meadow Lakes Golf and Country Club, an investment he was required to remain distant from while serving as a minister, in order to avoid the appearance of conflict of interest.

Hart has lived in the Yukon since 1979.

Electoral record

Yukon general election, 2011

|-

| NDP
| Jan Stick
| align="right"| 380
| align="right"| 39.2%
| align="right"| +18.7%
|-

|-

| Liberal
| Dan Curtis
| align="right"| 275
| align="right"| 28.3%
| align="right"| -9.5%
|-
! align=left colspan=3|Total
! align=right| 969
! align=right| 100.0%
! align=right| –
|}

Yukon general election, 2006

|-

| Liberal
| Phil Treusch
| align="right"|324
| align="right"|37.8%
| align="right"|+3.6%

| NDP
| Peter Lesniak
| align="right"|176
| align="right"|20.5%
| align="right"|-5.6%
|-
! align=left colspan=3|Total
! align=right| 857
! align=right| 100.0%
! align=right| –
|}

Yukon general election, 2002

|-

| Liberal
| Sue Edelman
| align="right"|332
| align="right"|34.2%
| align="right"|-14.7%

| NDP
| Cary Gryba
| align="right"|253
| align="right"|26.1%
| align="right"|-1.3%
|-
! align=left colspan=3|Total
! align=right| 970
! align=right| 100.0%
! align=right| –
|}

Notes

Yukon Party MLAs
Living people
Year of birth missing (living people)
Politicians from Whitehorse
21st-century Canadian politicians